The 2019 Lebanese Elite Cup was the 22nd edition of the Lebanese Elite Cup. The competition included the six best teams from the 2018–19 Lebanese Football League season. The first matchday was played on 20 July, one day after the start of the 2019 Lebanese Challenge Cup. Nejmeh were the defending champions, having won the 2018 final. The final was held on 25 August, with Shabab Sahel beating Ansar on penalty shoot-outs.

Group stage

Group A

Group B

Final stage

Semi-finals

Final

Top scorers

References

External links
 RSSSF

Lebanese Elite Cup seasons
Elite